The Black, Latino and Asian (BLA) Caucus is a caucus of members of the New York City Council. The Caucus's stated purpose is to "make sure issues of particular concern to the New York City's Black, Latino, and Asian communities through the legislative, oversight, and budgetary powers of the City Council." The Caucus submits an annual list of funding priority recommendations to the New York City Council Speaker's office so that the budget will address the needs of organizations serving the Caucus's constituencies.

Current members

Leadership history

References

External links 
 Official website

New York City Council
Issue-based groups of legislators